York Public Schools is a public school district in York County, Nebraska, in the United States, based in York.

Schools
The York Public Schools School District has one elementary school, one middle school, and one high school.

Elementary school
 York Elementary School

Middle school
 York Middle School

High school
 York High School

References

External links
 

School districts in Nebraska
Education in York County, Nebraska